The Shocking Miss Emerald is the second studio album by Caro Emerald.  The album was written and produced by David Schreurs, Vincent Degiorgio, Jan van Wieringen and Emerald, with contributions from Wieger Hoogendorp, Robin Veldman and Guy Chambers and released on 3 May 2013 on Grandmono Records. In the UK, the album was released by Dramatico. The album includes singles "Tangled Up" and "Liquid Lunch".

In the UK, Emerald performed tracks from the album at BBC Radio Theatre, which was broadcast on BBC Radio 2 and on the BBC Red Button. The Shocking Miss Emerald debuted atop the UK Albums Chart with 34,246 copies sold in its first week, becoming Emerald's first UK number-one album.

Singles
"Tangled Up" written by Schreurs, Degiorgio and Guy Chambers was released as the lead single from the album on 18 February 2013. The song reached number sixteen on the Dutch Top 40, number seventy-seven on the UK Singles Chart, it has also been a Top 20 hit in New Zealand.

"Liquid Lunch" was released as the second single from the album on 21 May 2013. It was BBC Radio 2's Record of the Week and joined their playlist in mid-May 2013; it was 'A' listed, just as "Tangled Up" had been. As of Sunday 2 June it had reached No. 10 on the UK Indie Chart.

Critical reception
The album received generally positive reviews from music critics. Simon Price of The Independent gave the album a positive review stating, "The danger facing this Dutch diva as she follows up the multi-platinum Deleted Scenes… in a marketplace packed with similarly retro-styled chanteuses is that she'll sound like a redundant cabaret turn. What saves TSME is its often-inspired mix of vintage jazz and modern hip hop. Her secret weapon, in this respect, is producer David Schreurs, who rescues Emerald’s second album from turning into one long perfume ad, albeit a charming one." Stephen Unwin of the Daily Express said, "it is stylish and jazz-age infused. The stakes are high as Caro's breakthrough album sold like a crazy thing but those stakes needn't have worried. Sassy, smouldering and quite possibly the soundtrack to your summer."

Track listing

Charts and certifications

Weekly charts

Year-end charts

Certifications

Release history

References

2013 albums
Caro Emerald albums